Glass Palace may refer to:

Buildings
Glaspaleis, a former fashion house and department store in Heerlen, Netherlands; now a cultural center
Glaspalast (Munich), a former exhibition hall in Munich, Germany
Glaspalast (Sindelfingen), an indoor sporting arena in Sindelfingen, Germany

Other uses
The Glass Palace, a novel by Amitav Ghosh

See also
Crystal Palace (disambiguation)